Skipper v. South Carolina, 476 U.S. 1 (1986), is a United States Supreme Court case in which the Court held that the rule from Lockett v. Ohio (1978) dictated that mitigating evidence not be subject to limitations based on relevance.

Background
Ronald DeRay Skipper was convicted of capital murder and rape in South Carolina. During the penalty phase of his bifurcated trial, as required by Gregg v. Georgia (1976), Skipper sought to introduce as mitigating evidence that he had "adjusted well" to his pre-trial incarceration. The trial court ruled the evidence irrelevant, in keeping with controlling South Carolina caselaw, excluded the evidence. Skipper was subsequently sentenced to death.

Holding
The Court held that, under Lockett, the exclusion of mitigating evidence on relevance grounds, as articulated by the South Carolina Supreme Court, violated the Eighth and Fourteenth Amendments and vacated the sentence.

See also
List of United States Supreme Court cases, volume 476

External links
 

1986 in United States case law
Capital punishment in South Carolina
Cruel and Unusual Punishment Clause and death penalty case law
United States criminal due process case law
United States Supreme Court cases
United States Supreme Court cases of the Burger Court